Villavieja de Yeltes is a municipality in Salamanca, Castile and León, Spain.

Geography 
The municipality is in the western portion of Castile and León, about 290 km from Madrid, at 738 meters above sea level. Its northern and eastern borders are formed by the Yeltes river, and its entire area is in the river's drainage basin. Its highest point is 828 meters above sea level, in La Berzosa.

History 
The shores of the Yeltes river have been inhabited since prehistoric times, as indicated by artifacts found there. Megalithic-stage structures were scattered throughout the area, and many remains have been discovered from the medieval period.

Demographics 
The population has fallen inexorably since 2001.

References

Municipalities in the Province of Salamanca